K217 or K-217 may refer to:

K-217 (Kansas highway), a former state highway in Kansas
K. 217 ("Voi avete un cor fedele"), a 1775 concert aria by W. A. Mozart
HMS Swale (K217), a former UK Royal Navy ship